Wreck (originally titled Wrecked) is a British comedy horror television series created and written by Ryan J. Brown. It stars Oscar Kennedy as Jamie, a young man who takes a job on board a cruise ship in order to investigate the disappearance of his sister. It premiered on BBC Three on 9 October 2022, with all episodes airing on BBC iPlayer on the same day. The series received mixed reviews, but was received favourably by the LGBTQ+ press with Attitude, Gay Times and The Queer Review featuring the series on their lists of Top LGBT TV Shows of 2022.

The show was renewed for a second series in October 2022, set for a 2023 broadcast.

Cast

Main
 Oscar Kennedy as Jamie Walsh/"Cormac Kelly", a nineteen-year-old who takes a job on the Sacramentum to find out what happened to his sister
 Thaddea Graham as Vivian Lim, one of Jamie's colleagues who works on the Sacramentum after fleeing her homophobic family 
 Jack Rowan as Danny Jones, Pippa's ex-boyfriend and a member of the entertainment team 
 Anthony Rickman as Olly Reyes, a member of the Sacramentum's crew who befriends Jamie and Vivian
 Louis Boyer as Sam Rhodes, an officer on the Sacramentum 
 Alice Nokes as Sophia Leigh, queen bee of the Sacramentum's entertainment team
 Peter Claffey as Cormac Kelly, Jamie's friend with whom he switches identities in order to get onto the Sacramentum
 Miya Ocego as Rosie Preston, Comac's ex-girlfriend and a transgender woman who works as a Cher impersonator
 Jodie Tyack as Pippa Walsh, Jamie's sister who disappeared while working on the Sacramentum

Recurring
 Harriet Webb as Karen MacIntyre, the crew manager of the Sacramentum
 Warren James Dunning as Officer Beaker, an officer on the Sacramentum and Karen's second-in-command
 Amber Grappy as Lauren Thompson, one of Jamie and Vivian's colleagues
 Diego Andres as Jerome Dupont, one of Jamie and Vivian's colleagues
 Louise Parker as Jenny, one of Jamie and Vivian's colleagues
 Georgia Goodman as Dolce, a cleaner on the Sacramentum
 James Phoon as Hamish Campbell, a member of the Sacramentum's entertainment team
 Ali Hardiman as Bethany-May, a member of the Sacramentum's entertainment team
 Melissa Dilber and Merih Dilber as Amy #1 and Amy #2, twin sisters who are members of the Sacramentum's entertainment team
 Ramanique Ahluwalia as Lily Tee, a wealthy guest onboard the Sacramentum
 Ned Costello as Nile, a wealthy guest onboard the Sacramentum and Lily's stepbrother
 Donald Sage Mackay as Henry Allan, the director of the Sacramentum
 Francis Flores as The Baby, the Sacramentum's tattooist
 Marcia Lecky as Detective Martinez, a detective who boards the Sacramentum to investigate a suspicious death

Production
BBC Three commissioned Wrecked from Euston Films in March 2021. Written by Ryan J. Brown and directed by Chris Baugh, the six 45-minute episode series is executive produced by Noemi Spanos for Euston Films and Tommy Bulfin for the BBC.

While writing the show, Brown purposefully included explicit LGBT themes (both Jamie and Vivian are gay), explaining that "as a gay man and horror fan, I think horror has always been queer but it's always coded, and subtext. I thought, 'let's do away with the subtext. Let's have explicit representation" and adding that he was used to LGBT characters always being the sidekicks in horror content. Simultaneously, Brown was careful to ensure that Jamie and Vivian's sexuality did not define them as characters but that he did not dismiss this either, noting that "growing up gay has equipped them to be the perfect heroes but the story doesn't need to be about their trauma".

The cast was confirmed in March 2022, with Oscar Kennedy set to star as the lead Jamie. Also part of the cast were Thaddea Graham, Jack Rowan, and Jodie Tyack as well as Louis Boyer, Anthony Rickman, Amber Grappy, Diego Andres, Peter Claffey, Miya Ocego, Warren James Dunning, Ramanique Ahluwalia, and Alice Nokes. In a video posted to Instagram, Brown explained that Jamie is named after Jamie Lee Curtis, best known for playing Laurie Strode in the Halloween film franchise, and Jesse Walsh, the character played by Mark Patton in A Nightmare on Elm Street 2: Freddy's Revenge, whom he dubbed the "first male scream queen".

Principal photography took place in Northern Ireland.

In October 2022, prior to the first series' broadcast, it was announced that a second series of the show has been in development, and that the show was designed to run for at least three.

Episodes 
All episodes were made available on BBC iPlayer on October 9, 2022 prior to their linear broadcast.

Critical reception

Both Attitude and Gay Times featured Wreck on their list of Top LGBT TV Shows of 2022.

In a four-star review, Benji Wilson of The Telegraph praised the premise and Chris Baugh's directing and described the series as being like a punk band at their first gig stating, "Wreck’s energy is infectious. Everyone on the ship is a suspect and no-one can get off. If that’s just Death on the Nile with ADHD, fine: I still want to know whodunit. And why they’re wearing a duck mask." Similarly, Neil Baker from Cinerama lauded BBC Three for commissioning the show, and referred to Wreck'''s killer duck as a "slasher icon". He called Brown's screenplay "as sharp as the knife our devilish duck wields", noting his ability to reference classic horror properties such as Scream, I Know What You Did Last Summer and Friday the 13th while still allowing Wreck to feel "fresh and different to anything else we have seen", and praised the series' humour, pacing, cinematography and queer representation. The show also received four-star reviews from Heat, which declared it a "stylish" and "fresh, vibrant, chilling horror treat", and TVTimes, who noted that the show "delivers jump-scares and witty one-liners with equal aplomb". In their round-up of new shows, NME referred to Wreck as a "comic-horror delight" and a "mishcevious slasher in the vein of Scream".

In a wider article praising the series' queer and Asian representation, Alistair James of Attitude stated "the inclusion of LGBTQ characters doesn’t feel tokenistic or as if it’s been done to check a box. Therefore it’s more rewarding to watch as an audience. It feels sincere and heartfelt."

In a mixed three-star review, Rachel Sigee of iNews praised the "refreshing" queer representation but criticised the show's merging of comedy and horror, stating that "with its original premise, game approach to genre-bending and admirable sense of silliness, Wreck certainly stands out, if not always for the right reasons."

Among more negative reviews from critics, the series received two stars from The Times, The Evening Standard and the Daily Mail'', who said "there’s not a great deal to recommend this barking mad drama, which is a cross between a high-school comedy movie and a slasher flick with the killer being Orville the Duck," and described it as “more convoluted with each episode, taking viewers from one daft plot to another like a marble in a pinball machine” and “This camp horror thriller is a bit confused about its identity."
 Brown hit back at the negative reviews, stating on his Twitter, "Nearly all of the “critics” only watched the first episode and have no idea what the show is about."

References

External links
 
 
 Wreck at BBC Programmes

English-language television shows
2022 British television series debuts
2020s British horror television series
2020s British LGBT-related comedy television series
BBC television comedy
Gay-related television shows
British horror comedy television series
LGBT speculative fiction television series
Television shows filmed in Northern Ireland
Television series about teenagers
Television series by Euston Films
Television series set on cruise ships
2020s British mystery television series